Group A of the 2011 Fed Cup Europe/Africa Zone Group II was one of four pools in the Europe/Africa zone of the 2011 Fed Cup. Three teams competed in a round robin competition, with the top team and the bottom team proceeding to their respective sections of the play-offs: the top teams played for advancement to Group I, while the bottom team faced potential relegation to Group III.

Finland vs. Morocco

Morocco vs. Portugal

Finland vs. Portugal

References

External links
 Fed Cup website

2011 Fed Cup Europe/Africa Zone